Yu Ying (born 16 February 1982) is a former professional tennis player from China.

Biography
A right-handed player from Hunan, Yu made her WTA Tour main draw debut at the Shanghai Open in 2002. After winning her way through qualifying, she was beaten in the first round by Antonella Serra Zanetti. As a doubles player she reached a top ranking of 155 in the world and was runner-up at the Guangzhou International Women's Open in 2004, partnering Yang Shujing.

Yu played in the doubles rubber of four Fed Cup ties for China in 2004, of which she won three.

WTA Tour career finals

Doubles (0–1)

ITF finals

Singles (1–1)

Doubles (6–2)

See also
 List of China Fed Cup team representatives

References

External links
 
 
 

1982 births
Living people
Chinese female tennis players
Tennis players from Hunan
21st-century Chinese women